Mary Kay Bergman (June 5, 1961 – November 11, 1999), also credited as Shannen Cassidy, was an American voice actress and voice-over teacher. She was the lead female voice actress on South Park from the show's 1997 debut until her death. Throughout her career, Bergman performed voice work for over 400 television commercials and voiced over 100 cartoon, film, and video game characters.

Born in Los Angeles, Bergman had an interest in fantasy and animation early in her life. She acted in plays during high school and also studied theater at University of California, Los Angeles (UCLA). After struggling to secure on-screen acting jobs, she began taking work as a voice-over actress. In 1989, she began voicing the Disney character Snow White. In the 1990s, she voiced Daphne Blake in three films from the Scooby Doo franchise as well as Timmy Turner in the Oh Yeah! Cartoons.

Shortly after her death, her husband Dino Andrade established the Mary Kay Bergman Memorial Fund.

Early life
Mary Kay Bergman was born on June 5, 1961, in Los Angeles, California to Jewish parents. She was the only child of musicians David "Dave" Bergman and Patricia Paris "Pat" McGowan. She grew up around the corner from the home of Adriana Caselotti, the original voice of Snow White.

Her parents performed as a singing duo at lounges and clubs in Reno and Las Vegas and in Los Angeles. They settled in Los Angeles after her mother became pregnant. Characterizing her mother's previous work inking and painting cels for Fleischer, Bergman said it was a mechanical task, but it piqued her mother's interest in animation that was shared with Bergman years later by watching Saturday morning cartoon series with her. Among Bergman's favorite series were Jonny Quest, The Flintstones, and Wait Till Your Father Gets Home, which she considered a "precursor to The Simpsons."

Bergman attended Le Conte Middle School and Hollywood High School, graduating in June 1978 with top academic honors. Following in the steps of one of her idols, Carol Burnett, Bergman attended University of California, Los Angeles (UCLA) and studied theater arts from 1978 until 1981. She was a classmate and friend of future The Simpsons voice actress Nancy Cartwright.

Career
After getting cast in an equity-waiver play outside of school, Bergman decided to leave UCLA. Having started acting in high school plays, she got an agent for on-camera commercials, film, and television and studied privately with acting coach Harry Mastrogeorge for several years. At age 16, Bergman received her first professional acting job in the television film Return Engagement, which starred Elizabeth Taylor. After leaving school, Bergman joined a small agency that had started six months earlier. She had an audition for an exercise program that was going to be on TV and got the role. She was hired because she had a "nice figure" but could also be a dancer, comedian, singer, or impressionist. However, less than a week after she got the job, the agency closed. Bergman said, "Everything fell apart. I thought, 'I'm really not getting anywhere. Maybe I should give up this silly dream of mine about becoming this great star and actually get a real job.'" In the 1990 Signing Time series, Bergman originally played Rachel in the UK version until her death. 

Bergman's next post was as a receptionist for the Boy Scouts of America. She enjoyed the job and was pleased to work with the people of the organization. Bergman commented, "All the time I kept hearing, 'Gosh, you have a lovely speaking voice. You should do something with that.'" She worked as a receptionist for an insurance company and from there she moved up the ranks to become an assistant underwriter, which she found extremely boring. To break the monotony, Bergman thought about becoming a disc jockey but could not find information about where to take classes and considered a career in the Air Force.

Voice acting
The origins of Bergman's voice acting can be traced to when she attended a housewarming party at one of her co-workers' houses. Someone brought a karaoke machine to the party and Bergman started "going wild", using several different voices. One of the guests at the party was studying with voice-over coach Kat Lehman and suggested she take a class with his teacher, which she did.

Bergman took many voice-over classes in order to do many different styles and voices. Some specialized in animation, some in ADR/looping, and others in commercial and improvisation. Bergman studied the skill of matching celebrity voices. Bergman stated that accents came very easily to her. She stated that she enjoyed doing accents such as Chinese, Japanese, Australian, English, American, French, German, Spanish and Italian.

In 1994, Bergman started teaching the technique of doing voice-overs for animation at the Kalmenson and Kalmenson Studios in Burbank, California. After voicing the villain Dr. Blight on the series Captain Planet and the Planeteers, replacing Meg Ryan, she acquired a reputation for voice matching and began doing these matches for other actors such as Jodie Foster, Gillian Anderson, Helen Hunt, Julia Roberts, Jennifer Tilly, Emma Thompson, and Alfre Woodard.

Snow White
After her first voice role as a frightened woman in a radio commercial for a small home security company on a local station in 1986, and a few more radio spots in 1989, Bergman was not making enough to earn a living, so she worked part-time at Robinson's department store. During this time, she got the role with Disney as the voice of Snow White on tape, replacing Adriana Caselotti. She told her boss she needed the day off for the recording, but he refused and she left the post.

Disney was pleased with her performance, but she agreed to accept future jobs only when Caselotti was unavailable. She later learned that Disney had different plans. When Disney was releasing a restored version of Snow White, Caselotti was brought back in to record a scene that was missing its audio track. After the studio executives listened to her work, they chose to have Bergman record the scene instead. Caselotti was unaware her voice had been replaced until the 1993 Academy Awards, when she heard Bergman as Snow White presenting an award for best animated short subject. Disney received hundreds of complaints after the ceremony, noting the changes to the Snow White character that Jeffrey Katzenberg had made. Katzenberg apologized, and Bergman did not publicly admit to voicing Snow White while Caselotti was still alive.

South Park
Bergman was the original voice for most of the female characters for South Park and the feature film South Park: Bigger, Longer & Uncut (1999). Her characters included Liane Cartman, Sheila Broflovski, Shelly Marsh, Sharon Marsh, Carol McCormick and Wendy Testaburger. She was originally credited as Shannen Cassidy (taken from stars Shannen Doherty and David Cassidy) out of concerns regarding possible conflicts with her continued work as Disney's official Snow White voice. "It was a conscious decision to be anonymous at first, because none of us knew the show would be a hit, and if anyone tells you they did, they're lying", she said. "Then it did hit, and Shannen Cassidy was getting mail like Santa Claus, so we transitioned out of it." Bergman credited South Park for pulling her out of a typecasting rut. "I'm known for these sweet, cute little characters", she said, noting her roles in various Disney films. "So I've been doing them forever. My agents were trying to submit me on shows that are edgy, and they're laughing, 'Mary Kay, are you kidding? No way!'" After Bergman's death, the two episodes "Starvin' Marvin in Space" (the final episode for which she recorded original dialogue) and "Mr. Hankey's Christmas Classics" (the final episode in which her voice was used via archive footage) were dedicated in her memory.

Other roles
Bergman worked on over 400 television commercials, including the voice of Mrs. Butterworth in Mrs. Butterworth's syrup commercials. She had roles in many Disney films, including Beauty and the Beast, as the Bimbettes; The Hunchback of Notre Dame, as Quasimodo's mother and Djali; Hercules, as several female characters; Mulan, as the female ancestors; and the posthumously released Toy Story 2, in which she is credited under "additional voices." Her appearances in video games included The Curse of Monkey Island.

She worked on other series including Jay Jay the Jet Plane, Oh Yeah! Cartoons, The Fairly OddParents, and several female voices in The Tick animated series. She also provided the voice of Gwen Stacy in the final episode of Spider-Man. Mary Kay Bergman then voiced the Scooby-Doo character Daphne Blake in Scooby-Doo on Zombie Island (1998), Scooby-Doo! and the Witch's Ghost (1999) and Scooby-Doo and the Alien Invaders (2000), this last one being a posthumous release and final film role, dedicated to her. Her other film role was in Balto II: Wolf Quest (2002), released three years after her death, in which she voiced a vixen and a wolverine.

Bergman contributed vocals to the "Weird Al" Yankovic song "Pretty Fly for a Rabbi", alongside Tress MacNeille. Al stated:

Originally I had Mary Kay come in to sing the whole song. I basically wanted her to do the voice of Kyle's mom from South Park. Her agent wouldn't let her do it (thinking that it might get her in trouble with Comedy Central)—so Mary Kay wound up doing kind of a squeaky voice instead. Later, I decided that the "squeaky voice" thing really wasn't what I was looking for, so I called in my old friend Tress to do her Fran Drescher impersonation instead. The part that you can still hear Mary Kay on is the line in the middle of the song where she does the very Gentile-sounding "for a Rab-bi...".

Personal life
Bergman married voice actor Dino Andrade on April 7, 1990. They remained married until Bergman's suicide in November 1999.

Death
Bergman suffered from bipolar and generalized anxiety disorders, which she hid from her family, friends, and her co-stars. When her mother was diagnosed with cancer, Bergman's depression was mistaken as a reaction to her mother's illness along with job-related stress. Andrade said that he found herbal mood medications that Bergman had hidden in their home.

Bergman had privately confessed to her husband that she was "afraid of losing her talent," as sessions were not going well. She was concerned that people would feel that her talent had gone, and that her career would come to an end. Andrade later regretted that Bergman had told nobody about her distress. As time went by, Bergman's fears seemed to lessen as her mother was doing better. Bergman and her husband were also planning to purchase a new house within a year, but she still suffered physically. Because of this, she and her husband decided to have an elaborate vacation in Las Vegas, which they had planned a week before her death.

On the morning of November 11, 1999, Bergman contributed to a radio program celebrating Disneyland's 45th anniversary. She was last seen alive at 9 p.m., while she was talking to a friend on the phone. An hour and 20 minutes later, her husband and his friend, John Bell, returned home to find that she had shot herself in the head with a 12-gauge shotgun.

Aftermath and legacy

Memorials and legacy

Dino Andrade established the Mary Kay Bergman Memorial Fund, which contributes to operation of the Suicide Prevention Center at the Didi Hirsch Community Mental Health Center. To benefit the Mary Kay Bergman Memorial Fund, a Memorial Celebration and Concert was held in March 2000. Many industry voice actors came to the event including Jane Jacobs, Mona Marshall (who would be one of her South Park successors), Barbara Goodson and Diane Michelle, all of whom sang in the choir. The service was held at the Hollywood Roosevelt Hotel in the Blossom Room, where the first Academy Awards was presented in 1929. Also contributing to the memorial fund was March 28, 2000's Los Angeles edition of the Daily Variety magazine, which ran a full-page Oscar version of the Open Letter to All by Andrade.

Bob's Video, made by Mary Kay & Dino's production company, Klaxon Filmworks, had been completed before Bergman died but was posthumously shown at the HBO Urban World Film Festival, at the Blue Sky Festival, and at a Mary Kay Bergman memorial screening. This included her only live-action role, a few voice roles, still photography, and work as executive producer for the film.

Bergman's interview on Nightcap, a show by Chapman University, was recorded on November 5, 1999, but was aired posthumously. The episode was dedicated to her.

Al Lowe, who had worked with Bergman on three Leisure Suit Larry video games, posted a tribute to her on his website. He stated, "Mary Kay was the sort of person who could light up a room just by entering. She was a joy to work with and made me look good as a novice voice-over director. It was therefore even more shocking when I learned that she had taken her own life."

Scooby-Doo and the Alien Invaders was the last Scooby-Doo film to feature Bergman as the voice of Daphne, and it was dedicated to her memory.

Bergman is buried at Forest Lawn Memorial Park in the Hollywood Hills.

Replacements

In an August 2010 interview, Bergman's friend and student Grey DeLisle, who inherited the role of Daphne Blake in the Scooby-Doo franchise, said of her:

In a March 2000 interview, South Park creators and stars Matt Stone and Trey Parker said about Bergman:

Voice actresses Mona Marshall and Eliza Schneider replaced Bergman for a select few female characters on South Park.

Voice actress Tara Strong replaced Bergman as the voice of Timmy Turner in The Fairly OddParents, as well as redubbing Bergman's lines from the Oh Yeah! Cartoons era.  

Voice actress Debi Derryberry was cast to replace Bergman as the voice of Jay Jay, Herky, Savannah, and Revvin' Evan on Jay Jay the Jet Plane.

Filmography

Film

Television

Video games

Live-action

References

External links

 Mary Kay Bergman Personal Site and Memorial
 CNN Obituary
 

1961 births
1999 deaths
1999 suicides
20th-century American actresses
Actresses from Los Angeles
American video game actresses
American voice actresses
Audiobook narrators
Burials at Forest Lawn Memorial Park (Hollywood Hills)
Disney people
Hanna-Barbera people
Hollywood High School alumni
Suicides by firearm in California
UCLA Film School alumni
Female suicides